Qaleh-ye Khvajeh Rural District is a rural district (dehestan) in the Central District of Andika County, Khuzestan Province, Iran. At the 2006 census, its population was 13,094, in 2,218 families.  The rural district has 97 villages.

References 

Rural Districts of Khuzestan Province
Andika County